José Luis Salcedo Nieto (born 15 September 1959), known as Pepín, is a Spanish retired footballer who played as a defender.

Football career
Born in Aranjuez, Pepín played 275 official games for CA Osasuna over the course of seven La Liga seasons, having signed in the 1987 summer from local Community of Madrid side Rayo Vallecano.

He left the Navarrese at the end of the 1993–94 campaign, which ended in relegation, and, at the age of nearly 35, returned to his very first senior club Real Aranjuez CF in the lower leagues. With Osasuna, he also appeared in six complete matches in the 1991–92 UEFA Cup.

References

External links

1959 births
Living people
Spanish footballers
Footballers from the Community of Madrid
Association football defenders
La Liga players
Segunda División players
Segunda División B players
Tercera División players
Rayo Vallecano players
CA Osasuna players